This page represents the time-line for the breweries of Charrington and Bass with the merges, takeovers and separations throughout their recorded history.

References

Breweries in London
Business timelines
Breweries in England